Qaleh-ye Abdolabad (also Romanized as Qal‘eh-ye ʿAbdolābād) is a village in Sharifabad Rural District, Sharifabad District, Pakdasht County, Tehran Province, Iran. At the 2006 census, its population was 724, in 168 families.

References 

Populated places in Pakdasht County